Hassan Shojaee Aliabadi (Persian: حسن شجاعی علی آبادی) born 1981 in Zanjan, is a member and vice-chairman of the Commission on Article 90 of the Constitution of the Iranian Parliament. He has a doctorate in law from Tehran University of Justice and in 2021 he was the head of the Commission on Article 90 of the Constitution of the Iranian Parliament.

See also 

 List of Iran's parliament representatives (11 th term)

References 

Living people
1981 births
Iranian politicians
People from Zanjan Province